KJNP (1170 AM) and KJHA (88.7 FM) are non-commercial radio stations which simulcast their programming. KJNP is licensed to North Pole, Alaska and serves the Fairbanks area.  KJHA is licensed to Houston, Alaska, just north of Anchorage. The stations air a Christian radio format.

KJNP's radio studios and transmitter are located a short distance northeast of the city center of North Pole, off the Richardson Highway. KJNP is a Class A station broadcasting on the clear-channel frequency of 1170 AM.

KJHA's transmitter is off Route 3, South Parks Highway, north of Houston.

In addition to the main stations, programming is relayed by an additional five FM translators to widen its broadcast area.

These radio stations were founded by Don and Gen Nelson; the former died in 1997. The AM incarnation of KJNP was the first of these stations, launched in 1967. KJNP-FM and KJNP-TV both followed in 1981. KJHA followed many years later.

In addition to the broadcasting ministry, Don Nelson made scores of road trips over the course of several decades between Alaska and his home state of Minnesota, conducting another ministry along the Alaska Highway and in numerous small towns in Canada.

The station airs one of the few non-English-language programs heard in the Fairbanks area, a weekly program in Iñupiaq produced by parishioners from First Presbyterian Church of Fairbanks.

See also
 KJNP-FM
 KJNP-TV

References

External links

Moody Radio affiliate stations
Radio stations established in 1967
JNP (AM)